Nautocapsa is a green algae genus in the family Palmellopsidaceae.

References

Chlamydomonadales genera
Chlamydomonadales